Glumicalyx goseloides, the nodding chocolate flower, is a species of flowering plant in the family Scrophulariaceae, native to high altitude areas of South Africa. A clumping perennial reaching , and possibly hardy in USDA zones 6 through 9, its flowers give off a chocolate scent. It is not readily available in commerce.

References

Scrophulariaceae
Endemic flora of South Africa
Flora of the Cape Provinces
Flora of the Free State
Flora of KwaZulu-Natal
Plants described in 1977